The Wolf River is a river in census division No. 22 in Manitoba, Canada. It is in the Hudson Bay drainage basin and is a right tributary of the Hayes River.

Course
The river begins at Hawkins Lake and heads northeast to Bayly Lake. From Bayley Lake, one can make a short portage east to Bayly Bay on Gods Lake, source of the Gods River. The Wolf River then heads north to Fishing Eagle Lake, then turns west and reaches its mouth on the east side of Knee Lake. Knee Lake empties via the Hayes River to Hudson Bay.

References

See also
List of rivers of Manitoba

Rivers of Manitoba
Tributaries of Hudson Bay